Jörgen Sundeqvist (born 1962) is a Swedish Accordionist. He toured the United States and Great Britain in 2006 with Øivind Farmen.

References 

Swedish accordionists
1962 births
Living people
Place of birth missing (living people)
21st-century accordionists